Helene Louvart (born 1964) is a French cinematographer. She graduated in 1985 from the prestigious École nationale supérieure Louis-Lumière in Paris. She is a member of French Society of Cinematographers (AFC), the French equivalent of American Society of Cinematographers. She has worked with many French and international directors, such as Wim Wenders, Agnès Varda, Claire Denis, Christophe Honoré, Jacques Doillon, Nicolas Klotz, Sandrine Veysset, Marc Recha, Alice Rohrwacher, and Léos Carax.

Life and career
École nationale supérieure Louis-Lumière graduates, who are actively sought by film producers, consistently rank in the top echelon of French cinema professionals. In keeping with this College's reputation for producing masters of their craft, Hélène Louvart's first hire on a feature film came immediately after graduation with the post of cinematographer in 1986. In only 22 years since that time Helene has served as cinematographer on more than 59 feature films, 49 short feature films and documentaries (less than 60 minutes), 10 television projects and a few experimental and video projects. She has also directed 4 short films.

In 2008, Louvart was cinematographer on Petit indi, which was an official selection at the 2009 BFI London Film Festival. Louvart's work on the film, which was shot entirely on 35 mm 35mm, was nominated in the Best Cinematography (Millor Fotografia) category for the 2010 Gaudí Awards. Known in Catalan as Premis Gaudí, the Gaudi Awards are Catalonia's main national film awards, established in 2009 by Acadèmia del Cinema Català (Catalan Academy of Cinema).

As Director of Photography on the 3D documentary film Pina, about the late dance choreographer Pina Bausch, Hélène Louvart worked with renowned German director Wim Wenders, who also wrote the screenplay. Hailed internationally as the "best use of 3D technology since Avatar", Pina premiered out of competition at the 61st Berlin International Film Festival and went on to gather numerous international accolades and major awards and nominations. Pina was selected as the German entry for the Best Foreign Language Film at the 84th Academy Awards and was nominated by the Academy of Motion Picture Arts and Sciences for Best Documentary Feature. The film was also awarded Best Documentary by the European Film Awards, the German Film Awards, and the German Film Critics Association Awards.

For her extensive body of work and artistic excellence, Hélène Louvart received TheWIFTS Foundation 2012 Cinematographer Award.

Selected filmography
 Printemps perdu ? by Alain Mazard (1990)
 Will It Snow for Christmas? by Sandrine Veysset (1996)
 Je ne vois pas ce que l'on me trouve by Christian Vincent (1996)
 De l'autre côté de la mer by Dominique Cabrera (1998)
 Martha-Martha by Sandrine Veysset (1998)
 Nadia and the Hippos by Dominique Cabrera (1999)
 Pau and His Brother by Marc Recha (2001)
 The Milk of Human Kindness by Dominique Cabrera (2001)
 Where Is Madame Catherine? by Marc Recha (2003)
 Raja by Jacques Doillon (2003)
 Histoire d'un secret by Marianna Otero (2003)
 La blessure by Nicolas Klotz (2004)
 In the battlefields by Danielle Arbid (2004)
 Folle embellie by Dominique Cabrera (2004)
 A Piece of Sky by Bénédicte Liénard (2002)
 Ma mère by Christophe Honoré (2004)
 The Last Day by Rodolphe Marconi (2004)
 Quatre étoiles by Christian Vincent (2006)
 Dies d'agost by Marc Recha (2006)
 Les enfants by Christian Vincent (2005)
 Le premier venu by Jacques Doillon (2005)
 The Beaches of Agnès by Agnès Varda (2007)
 Salamandra by Pablo Agüero (2007)
 Petit Indi by Marc Recha (2007)
 At Ellen's age by Pia Marais (2009)
 Bye bye Blondie by Virginie Despentes (2009)
 Corpo celeste by Alice Rohrwacher (2011)
 Pina by Wim Wenders (2011)
 When I Saw You by Annemarie Jacir (2012)
 Atomic Age by Helena Klotz (2012)
 Spectrographies by SMITH_(artist) (2013)
 Apaches by Thierry de Peretti (2013)
 Good bye Morocco by Nadir Moknèche (2013)
 Xenia by Panos H. Koutras (2014)
 The Smell of Us by Larry Clark (2014)
 The Wonders by Alice Rohrwacher (2014)
 Histoire d'une mère by Sandrine Veysset (2015)
 Arianna by Carlo Lavagna (2015)
 A Perfect Day to Fly by Marc Recha (2015)
 Peur de rien by Danielle Arbid (2015)
 Dark Night by Tim Sutton (2015)
 Beach Rats by Eliza Hittman (2017)
 Happy as Lazzaro by Alice Rohrwacher (2018)
 Petra by Jaime Rosales (2018)
 Rocks by Sarah Gavron (2019)
 Never Rarely Sometimes Always by Eliza Hittman (2020)
 The Lost Daughter by Maggie Gyllenhaal (2021)
 Wild Flowers by Jaime Rosales (2022)
 Nezouh by Soudade Kaadan (2022)
 Disco Boy by Giacomo Abbruzzese (2023)
 Firebrand by Karim Aïnouz (TBA)

Awards 

 Cinematographer Award 2012, Fondation WIFTS (Women’s International Film & Television Showcase)
 Gaudí Awards : Best Cinematography 2010 for "C'est ici que je vis (Petit Indi)", Marc Recha
 Marburger Kamerapreis 2018
 Robby Müller Award 2023
 Silver Bear for Outstanding Artistic Contribution (Cinematography), Berlinale 2023

References

External links

 Personal website

French cinematographers
Living people
French women cinematographers
1964 births